Muhammad Naeem Akhtar Khan Bhabha is a Pakistani politician who was a Member of the Provincial Assembly of the Punjab from 2008 to May 2018. He was appointed to the post of Provincial Minister of Punjab for Agriculture in 2016.

Early life and education
He was born on 20 February 1972 in Vehari District, Punjab.

He graduated from University of the Punjab.

Political career
He was elected to the Provincial Assembly of the Punjab as a candidate of Pakistan Muslim League (N) (PML-N) from Constituency PP-237 (Vehari-VI) in 2008 Pakistani general election.

He was re-elected to the Provincial Assembly of the Punjab as an independent candidate from Constituency PP-237 (Vehari-VI) in 2013 Pakistani general election. He joined PML-N in May 2013. In December 2013, he was appointed as Parliamentary Secretary for communication and works.

In November 2016, he was inducted into the provincial Punjab cabinet of Chief Minister Shehbaz Sharif and was made Provincial Minister of Punjab for Agriculture.

References

Living people
Punjab MPAs 2013–2018
1972 births
Pakistan Muslim League (N) politicians
Punjab MPAs 2008–2013